Kowa Company, Ltd. is a Japanese specialized trading company and manufacturer. Its headquarters are located in Nagoya, the capital of Japan's Aichi prefecture.

Overview 

Kowa Company is the core of the umbrella Kowa Group. Other companies within the group include Kowa's sibling firm  and the consolidated subsidiary . Its predecessor, Hattori Kensaburo Shoten, notably supported the industrialist Sakichi Toyoda's development of his automatic loom. The business is divided into trading and manufacturing divisions. The trading company division trades in fibers, machines, building materials, watercraft, mineral resources, chemical materials, and everyday goods. Meanwhile, the manufacturing division produces medicine, medical equipment, optical instruments, and energy-saving products.

Marketing of Kowa medical products under such brand names as Colgen Kowa and Cabagin Kowa via nationwide TV commercials increased the company's brand recognition. The company also manufactures and sells Prominar-brand camera lenses, spotting scopes, and video equipment that is used by NHK and various commercial TV and radio stations.

The company also owned the now-defunct radio station RADIO-i.

History

Predecessor company 

 1894: Fiber wholesaler Hattori Kensaburo Shoten is established in Nagoya
 1912: Reorganized and established as a corporation, Hattori Shoten Co., Ltd.
 1919: Added a spinning operation
 1920: Founder Hattori Kensaburo kills himself at age 51 after facing bankruptcy

Current corporation 

 1939: Trading division separated and established as Kaneka Hattori Shoten Company, Ltd.
 1943: Name changed to Kofu Sangyo Company, Ltd.
 1945: Expanded beyond textiles
 1960: Name changed to Kowa Company, Ltd.

Promotion 
Kowa's mascot is a frog often referred to as Kero-chan. In 2020, Kowa acquired the naming rights for a Nagoya baseball stadium, now known as the Vantelin Dome Nagoya, after one of its pharmaceutical products.

References 

Trading companies of Japan
Pharmaceutical companies of Japan
Medical technology companies of Japan
Manufacturing companies based in Nagoya
Electronics companies of Japan
Telescope manufacturers
Optics manufacturing companies
Photography companies of Japan
Japanese companies established in 1939